Murguía is the Spanish version of a Basque place-name and a surname.

People
Notable people with the surname include:
 Alejandro Murguía (born 1949), American poet, short story writer, and editor
 Alfredo Murguía (born 1969, Mexican football manager and player
 Ana Ofelia Murguía (born 1933), Mexican actress
 Carlos Murguia (born 1957), American judge
 Guadalupe Murguía Gutiérrez (born 1955), Mexican lawyer and politician
 Janet Murguía (born 1960), American civil rights activist
 Luis Alfredo Murguía (born 1956), Mexican politician
 Manuel Murguía (1833-1923), Galician journalist and historian
 Margarita Chávez Murguía (born 1959), Mexican architect and politician
 Mary H. Murguia (born 1960), American judge
 Rafael Murguía (born 1986), Mexican football player
 Verónica Murguía (born 1960), Mexican fantasy writer

Place
 The Spanish version of the name of the village of Murgia, in the Province of Álava, Basque Country, Spain.